All Saints' Episcopal Church, is an historic Carpenter Gothic church built in 1892 on Simpson Avenue in Round Lake, New York. It is a contributing property in the Round Lake Historic District.

See also

 Round Lake, New York

References

External links
 www.allsaintsroundlake.com
 Diocese of Albany
 Village of Round Lake website

Episcopal church buildings in New York (state)
Carpenter Gothic church buildings in New York (state)
Churches in Saratoga County, New York
Historic district contributing properties in New York (state)
National Register of Historic Places in Saratoga County, New York
Churches on the National Register of Historic Places in New York (state)